Davida Hawthorn was a United States international table tennis player. She was from New York.

She won a three bronze medals at the 1947 World Table Tennis Championships in the women's team, women's doubles with Lea Thall-Neuberger and mixed doubles with William Holzrichter.

She was inducted into the USA Table Tennis Hall of Fame in 1994 and was the 1945 US champion.

See also
 List of table tennis players
 List of World Table Tennis Championships medalists

References

American female table tennis players
1918 births
Possibly living people
World Table Tennis Championships medalists
20th-century American women